The Illusion is a one-design, single-handed keelboat based on the lines of a 12-metre yacht. Its features include foot pedal steering, genoa roller reefing, full trimming facilities and large buoyancy tanks. It was designed by Jo Richards and Neil Graham in 1981.

UK clubs 

Clubs racing Illusions in the UK are:
Broxbourne SC, Broxbourne (Herts)</ref>
Bembridge SC (IoW)
Middle Nene SC, Thrapston (Northants.)
West Kirby SC, Wirral (Merseyside)

See also 
 2.4 Metre (keelboat)
 Deception Mini 12 (keelboat)

References

External links 

 UK National Illusion Class Website

Vehicles introduced in 1981
Keelboats